This is a list of employer associations and other business organizations.

Albania
 Konfindustria (Konfederata e Industrive te Shqiperise)

Austria
 Federation of Austrian Industry (Vereinigung der Österreichischen Industrie (VÖI))

Australia
 Master Plumbers and Gasfitters Association of Western Australia (Union of Employers)
Australian Aluminium Council
 Australian Chamber of Commerce and Industry
 Australian Dental Industry Association
 Australian Federation of Employers and Industries (AFEI)
 Australian Gift & Homewares Association
 Australian Industry Group
 Australian Uranium Association
 Business Council of Australia
 Business Software Association of Australia
 Cotton Australia
 Insulation Council of Australia and New Zealand
 The Pharmacy Guild of Australia
 Victorian Employers' Chamber of Commerce and Industry
 Federal Chamber of Automotive Industry
 Master Grocers Australia

Belgium
 Federation of Enterprises in Belgium (FEB)

Brazil
 National Industry Confederation (CNI)

Bulgaria
 Bulgarian Industrial Association
 Bulgarian Chamber of Commerce and Industry
 Confederation of Employers and Industrialists in Bulgaria
 Union for Private Economic Enterprise

Canada

 Canadian Iron Founders' Association

Croatia
 Croatian Employers' Association

Czech Republic
 Industrial Union of the Czech Republic

Colombia
 National Employers Association of Colombia (ANDI - Asociación Nacional de Empresarios de Colombia)

Cyprus
 Cyprus Employers & Industrialists Federation

Denmark
 Confederation of Danish Industries (Dansk Industry)

Estonia
 Estonian Business Association

Finland
 Confederation of Finnish Industries (EK)

Fiji
 Fiji Commerce and Employers Federation (FCEF)

France
 Fédération nationale des transporteurs routiers
 General Confederation of small and middle size enterprises of France (CGPME)
 Mouvement des Entreprises de France (MEDEF)

Georgia 

 Georgian Employers Association (GEA) (საქართველოს დამსაქმებელთა ასოციაცია)

Germany 

 Confederation of Industry of Germany (BDI)
 Confederation of Unions of Employers of Germany (BDA)

Greece 

 Federation of Greek Industries (Σύνδεσμος Ελληνικών Βιομηχανιών (ΣΕΒ))

Hong Kong
 Employers' Federation of Hong Kong

Hungary
 Hungarian Confederation of Employers' Organizations (CEHIC)
 Confederation of Hungarian Employers and Industrialists (Munkaadók és Gyáriparosok Országos Szövetsége (MGYOSZ))

Iceland
 Confederation of Icelandic Employers

Indonesia
 Indonesian Employers Association

Italy
 Confederation of Italian Industry (CONFINDUSTRIA)
 Association of Small Businesses (Associazione Piccole e Medie  - API)
 Confederation of Agricultural Businesses (CONFAGRICOLTURA)

Ireland
 Irish Business and Employers Confederation (IBEC)

Jamaica
 Jamaica Employers' Federation

Japan
 （JCCI）
 
 Japan Association of Corporate Executives
 Japan Business Federation  (and regional associations including Tokyo Employer's Association et al.)
 Japan Automobile Manufacturers Association
 British Chamber of Commerce in Japan
 Japan Entrepreneurs & Presidents Association

Kenya
 Federation of Kenya Employers

Latvia
 Latvian Confederation of Industrialists

Mauritius
 Mauritius Employers' Federation

Mexico
 Coparmex (Confederación Patronal de la República Mexicana)

Morocco
 Confédération Générale des Entreprises du Maroc (CGEM)

The Netherlands
 VNO-NCW (Verbond van Nederlandse Ondernemingen, Nederlands Christelijk Werkgeversverbond)

New Zealand
BusinessNZ

Norway
 Confederation of Norwegian Enterprise (NHO)
 Enterprise Federation of Norway (Hovedorganisasjonen Virke)
 Norwegian Federation of Craft Enterprises (NHO Håndverk)

Poland
 Association of Industry, Commerce and Finance of Poland
 Chamber of Economy of the Republic of Poland

Portugal
 Portuguese Association of Industry

Romania
 Concordia Employers' Confederation - Romanian member of BusinessEurope
 National Confederation of Romanian Employers "General Union of Romanian Industrialists" UGIR-1903 - Founded 1903

Singapore
 Singapore National Employers Federation

Slovakia
 National Union of Employers
 Federation of Employers Associations of Slovakia

Slovenia
 Slovenian employers Association

Spain
 Employers Confederation of Spain
 Confederation of Employers and Industries of Spain (CEOE)
 The National Federation of Self-Employed workers and small entrepreneurs Associations in Spain (ATA Federation)

Sweden
 Confederation of Swedish Enterprise
 Swedish Agency for Government Employers

Switzerland
1) National organisations
economiesuisse
 Union patronale suisse (Schweizerisches Arbeitgsbegerverband)
 Union suisse des arts et métiers (Schweizericher Gewerbeverband)
 Swissmem (machine industry)

2) Regional organisations
Fédération des Entreprises Romandes Genève
 Fédération patronale vaudoise
 Gewerbeverband Basel-Stadt
 Kantonaler Gewerbeverband Zürich

Tunisia 
 Tunisian Confederation of Industry, Trade and Handicrafts (created in 1947)
 Tunisian Union of Agriculture and Fisheries (created in 1949)
 Confederation of Tunisian Citizen Enterprises (created in 2011)

United Kingdom
 Confederation of British Industry (CBI)
 Federation of Small Businesses
 Institute of Directors (IoD)
 Building and Engineering Services Association (BESA)

United States

 Associated Builders and Contractors
 Better Business Bureau
 California Employers Association
 Chicago Building Contractors' Council
 Citizens' Alliance
 Illinois Coal Operators' Association
 Lake Carriers' Association
 Mine Owners' Association
 National Association of Manufacturers
 Stove Founders' National Defense Association
 United States Chamber of Commerce

Venezuela
Fedecamaras
Consecomercio
Fedenagas

International 
 International Organisation of Employers 
 Mobile Payment Services Association
 World Shipping Council

Europe
 Confederation of European Business (BUSINESSEUROPE)
 Federation of International Employers (FedEE)

See also
 List of labor unions
 List of reference tables for more lists in the field of business

Footnotes

Employer associations

Labor relations